Garth (Powys) railway station serves the village of Garth, Powys, Wales. The railway station is located at street level at the end of the Llais yr Afon lane near the village centre.

It formerly had a passing loop and two platforms, but only one is now used (the disused one is overgrown but still visible).

Facilities
The facilities provided here are limited to a small brick waiting shelter, timetable poster board, digital CIS display and a customer help point. No ticketing provision is available, so passengers must buy in advance of travel or on board the train.

Services
All trains serving the station are operated by Transport for Wales. There are five trains a day in each direction from Monday to Saturday, and two services on Sundays. This is a request stop, whereby passengers have to signal to the driver to board or alight from the train.

References

Further reading

External links 

Railway stations in Powys
DfT Category F2 stations
Former London and North Western Railway stations
Railway stations in Great Britain opened in 1868
Heart of Wales Line
Railway stations served by Transport for Wales Rail
Railway request stops in Great Britain